The Windhaager Messe, WAB 25, is a missa brevis composed by Anton Bruckner in 1842.

History 
Bruckner composed the Windhaager Messe (WAB 25) in 1842, while he was a schoolteacher's assistant in Windhaag.

It was first believed that it was composed for Maria Jobst, the alto soloist in the Windhaag church choir. It is now stated that it was composed for her younger sister, Anna.

The work, the manuscript of which is stored in the archive of Wels, was first published in band I, pp. 173–189 of the Göllerich/Auer biography.

Setting 
The Windhaager Messe is a Missa brevis in C major for alto solo, two horns and organ.

The work is divided into six parts:
 Kyrie, C major
 Gloria, C major
 Credo, C major
 Sanctus, C major
 Benedictus, E major
 Agnus Dei, C major
Total duration: 8 to 10 minutes.

The work employs a text compressed to the absolute minimum and is predominantly homophonic in texture – often close to plainchant as, for example, the initial phrase of the Kyrie and the Credo – with occasional contrapuntal interruptions. The organ part consists of the alto solo line and a mostly unfigured bass. The use of horns "adds a warm, familiar timbre to music, and helps to clarify the harmony".

As in the Landmesse tradition, the Gloria and the Credo employ only a portion of the extensive text usually associated with these sections of the Mass. Such short masses (Missa brevis) were frequently performed in Austrian country churches, especially during Advent and Lent.

The short Sanctus presents the most extensive horn parts in the work. The Benedictus, in E major, is more melodic and uses a much less syllabic text setting than the rest of the work. The final notes of the Agnus Dei recall the closing of the Credo – a small, but effective touch of musical integration.

Bruckner’s designation of this composition as a Choral-Messe referred to its simple, hymn-like style. Tonally the work follows conventional harmonic patterns, but, as Bruckner was to do throughout his life, it also contains frequent modulations, often to rather distant keys, without the uses of pivot chords. The frequent appearances of unison passages throughout this work are an additional hallmark of Bruckner’s later style. Kinder concludes his analysis as:
...the attention lavished to this modest work is justified, not merely because it was Bruckner's first extended composition, but also because of its interesting and prophetic musical ideas.

Use in the modern liturgy 
To make the Windhaager Messe usable for Eucharist celebration Kajetan Schmidinger and Joseph Messner made in C. 1927 an arrangement for mixed choir with revised Gloria and Credo, and accompaniment by organ, horns and string quintet.

Selected discography

Original setting 
A selection among the recordings of the original setting of the Mass:
 Wolfgang Riedelbauch, Ingeborg Ruß (alto), Anton Bruckner - Psalm 146 and Windhaager Messe – LP: Colosseum SM 548, 1972.Transferred to CD, together with the historical recording of the "nullified" Symphony in D minor by Hortense von Gelmini: Klassic Haus KHCD 2012-007, 2012
 Ulrich Köbl, Cornelia Wulkopf (alto), Sakrale Waldhornmusik – CD: Ars FCD 368 304, 
 Rupert Gottfried Frieberger, Sigrid Hagmüller (alto), Anton Bruckner – Oberösterreichische Kirchenmusik – Fabian Records CD 5112, 1995
 Bernhard Prammer, Elisabeth Mayer (alto), Kammermusikalische Kostbarkeiten von Anton Bruckner – CD: Weinberg Records SW 01 036-2, 1996
 Valeri Polyansky, Ludmila Kunetsova (mezzo-soprano), Bruckner - Mass in C major, Mass No. 2 in E minor – Chandos CD CHAN 9863, 1998

Schmidinger & Messner's arrangement 
 Svetlana Girba, KHG-Chor Karlsruhe, Ralph Hammer (organ), Musica sacra – CD issued by the choir, 1999

References

Sources 
 August Göllerich, Anton Bruckner. Ein Lebens- und Schaffens-Bild,  – posthumous edited by Max Auer by G. Bosse, Regensburg, 1932
 Anton Bruckner – Sämtliche Werke, Band XXI: Kleine Kirchenmusikwerke, Musikwissenschaftlicher Verlag der Internationalen Bruckner-Gesellschaft, Hans Bauernfeind and Leopold Nowak (Editor), Vienna, 1984/2001
 Max Auer, Anton Bruckner. Sein Leben und Werk. Amalthea-Verlag, Vienna, c. 1950
 Robert Haas, Anton Bruckner, 2nd print (Reprint der Ausgabe Athenaion, Potsdam, 1934), Laaber Verlag, Regensburg, 1980. 
 Hansjürgen Schäfer, Anton Bruckner. Ein Führer durch Leben und Werk. Henschel Verlag, Berlin, 1996. 
 Uwe Harten, Anton Bruckner. Ein Handbuch. , Salzburg, 1996. .
 Keith William Kinder, The Wind and Wind-Chorus Music of Anton Bruckner, Greenwood Press, Westport CT, 2000. .
 John Williamson, The Cambridge Companion to Bruckner, Cambridge University Press, Cambridge, 2004. 
 Cornelis van Zwol, Anton Bruckner - Leven en Werken, Uit. Thot, Bussum, NL, 2012. 
 Crawford Howie, Anton Bruckner - A documentary biography, online revised edition

External links 

 Messe C-Dur - Windhaager Messe, WAB 25 Critical discography by Hans Roelofs  
 Smaller sacred works (1835–1892) Gesamtausgabe – Volume XXI
Live performances can be heard on YouTube
Original setting
 Gabriele Holzner (alto soloist), Josefin Bergmayr-Pfeiffer and Sophie Arzt (horns), Maria Kürner (organ) – Pfarrkirche Ansfelden, 10 November 2019:  Kyrie, Gloria, Credo, Sanctus & Benedictus, Agnus Dei
Schmidinger & Messner's arrangement
 Fra Stipica Grgat with the Choir und Chamber orchestra Gospe od Zdravlja (Our Lady of Health), Split (4 April 2010): Gospodine, smiluj se (Kyrie), Slava (Gloria), Svet i blagoslovljen (Sanctus & Benedictus) and Jaganjče Božji (Agnus Dei) - without Credo 
 St Mary Choir & Orchestra, Littleton (2013): Windhaager Messe, or (in better resolution) on John Berky's website: Mass in C Major "Windhaag Mass" - without Credo
 Martin Pfeiffer, St. Petrus church, Wolfenbüttel (2015): Bruckner's Messe in C
 Ricardo Luna with the Choir of the Karlskirche, Vienna (3 November 2019): Messe in C-Dur (Windhaager Messe)

Masses by Anton Bruckner
1842 compositions
Compositions in C major